Iratta is a 2023 Malayalam-language police procedural film written and directed by Rohit M. G. Krishnan featuring Joju George, Anjali, Arya Salim and Srikant Murali. The film revolves around the death of a policeman during his duty hours in Vagamon police station and the investigation that follows.

Plot
The film begins with the murder of ASI Vinod, the twin brother of DySP Pramod. There are three suspects in the murder: ASI John, CPO Bineesh, and another police officer. All three police officers worked with Vinod in the Vagamon police station and have developed animosity towards Vinod, due to different incidents. It is revealed through the incidents, narrated by the trio, one-by-one, that Vinod was a drunkard and womaniser. Bineesh narrates his incident where he caught Vinod raping a 17-year-old girl in a lodge, when they were out partying.

Pramod, who also used to be an alcoholic, is now sober but long separated from his wife, Sreeja, and daughter. Unable to withstand his behaviour, Sreeja took their newborn daughter and moved to Bombay 17 years ago, to be away from him. Pramod recalls his and Vinod's childhood. The two brothers grew up in the same household with an abusive and absent father, who also was incidentally a cop. One day, their parents have a violent fight, owing to their father's infidelity. This causes their parents' separation. Pramod stays with their mother, while Vinod is forcibly taken away by their father. This fuels Vinod's resentment towards Pramod and their mother, as he feels betrayed and left alone to face their father's abuse. One day, a couple of their father's neighbours and villagers hack their father to death, after he tried to sleep with an underage girl. Years later, both the twins become policemen, but take different paths. Pramod becomes a respected and honest Deputy Superintendent of Police (DySP), while Vinod becomes a violent and street-smart Assistant Sub-Inspector (ASI).

At present, DySP Satheesh, who has close ties with Vinod, leads the investigation. He also doubts Pramod, as he is aware of the duo's past and hatred towards each other. This is further fuelled by the statement of Vinod's lover, Malini, who recently came into his life and changed him for the better. Hence, Pramod is kept away from the investigation initially, but he requests to take over the case. He quickly proceeds with the investigation, and it turns out that all the three suspects have legitimate alibis. He then finds camera footage from a media personnel recording, in which he sees two children playing cricket with their dog in the nearby field. Upon contacting them, it is revealed that one of the kids saw the death of Vinod while picking up their cricket ball and that it was a suicide, not a murder as they initially thought.

Puzzled and shocked by the new discovery, Pramod starts to look into the motive for Vinod's suicide, especially since it seemed as though he was very happy after Malini had come into his life. At this point, a few constables from Vinod's station receive the footage of the TV channel that Vinod was watching at the time of his suicide. In the show are Sreeja and their now grown-up daughter, participating in a reality singing competition. Pramod is shocked when Bineesh, who caught Vinod raping the minor girl, confirms that she was the one in the room with Vinod. Pramod now gets the full picture; Vinod realised that he raped his own niece and, unable to bear the guilt of it, committed suicide.

The film ends with Sreeja trying to reconnect with Pramod, after hearing of Vinod's death. However, he strictly instructs her not to tell their daughter about him or ever show her his face, as she has unknowingly "saw" her father's face on that unfortunate night at the lodge. Pramod, unknowingly, has to now atone for the mistakes and sins of both Vinod and their father.

Cast

Release and reception
The film released in theatres in Kerala on 3 February 2023. It had its theatrical release outside Kerala on 17 February 2023, and had its digital premiere on Netflix on 3 March 2023.

The film received positive reviews. S. R. Praveen of The Hindu opined that "Joju George's double act and a gut-wrenching climax" redeems the otherwise "average police procedural." A reviewer from Malayala Manorama noted that the film is an "emotional, suspense-filled thriller," and "yet another excellent cinema in Malayalam." Rating the film 4/5, a reviewer from The Times of India wrote, "Iratta is a movie that draws you in, steals your breath and leaves you with pain." Telangana Today praised Joju George's ability to bring out the different exposure and exhibition of the two characters. Saketh Reddy Eleti of ABP Desam rates this Movie 3.5 out of 5 stars and wrote, "Iratta is an Excellent thriller with a Disturbing Twist." And Praised Joju Georges performance as Pramod and Vinod.

References

External links

2023 films
Films scored by Jakes Bejoy
2020s Malayalam-language films
2020s police procedural films